Delmar is an unincorporated community in Monongalia County, West Virginia, United States. It was also known as Hilderbrand.

References 

Unincorporated communities in West Virginia
Unincorporated communities in Monongalia County, West Virginia